Abū Yaʻqūb Isḥāq ibn Ibrāhīm ibn Mukhallad al-Ḥanẓalī, commonly known as Isḥāq ibn Rāhwayh (161 AH – 238 AH), was a Persian jurist and imam of Khorasan.

Along with Sufyan al-Thawri and Dawud al-Zahiri, he is cited in Lisanu-l-Arab (also spelled Lisan al-Arab) for taking the stance that once a man marries a slave and has children with her both she and the child are free, and the child cannot be enslaved. This was against the opinion of most Islamic scholars of jurisprudence of the time. He was also a fellow student and a friend of Ahmad ibn Hanbal who accompanied him on his travels to seek knowledge.

Influence 

Ibn Rahwayh helped to inspire al-Bukhari to compile what is now commonly known as Sahih al-Bukhari. Al-Bukhari stated, "We were with our teacher Ishaq ibn Rahwayh when he said: &apos;if only someone would compile a compact book for the authentic ahadith of the prophet, peace and blessings of Allah be upon him.&apos; That stirred something in my heart so I set out in compiling al-Jami as-Sahih".

Works 

Ibn Rahwayh's books on tafsir, ahadith and fiqh include:

 Al-Musnad (المسند)
 Al-Jāmiʻ al-Kabīr (الجامع الكبير)
 Al-Jāmiʻ al-Ṣaghir (الجامع الصغير)
 Al-Muṣannaf (المصنف)
 Al-ʻIlm (العلم)
 At-Tafsīr al-Kabīr (التفسير الكبير): lost work

References 

770s births
852 deaths
People from Merv
Hadith scholars
Atharis
Hadith compilers
Sunni imams
Persian Sunni Muslim scholars of Islam
9th-century Muslim scholars of Islam
People from Nishapur
Quranic exegesis scholars
Iranian scholars
Muhaddiths from Nishapur
8th-century writers
9th-century writers
9th-century jurists
9th-century Iranian people